The Battle of Chojnice occurred during the 1939 German invasion of Poland on the first day of the hostilities, 1 September. A detached unit from the Polish army Chojnice Detached Group under Colonel , part of the Czersk Operational Group under Stanisław Grzmot-Skotnicki, was assigned the task of defending the city of Chojnice, a major regional communications center, against the advancing German 20th Motorized Infantry Division in order to protect the southern flank of Army Pomorze.

The German attacks started at 04:30 with Stuka dive bombers, from 3/1 Stuka Geschwader, attacking the Tczew bridge.  The Wehrmacht then tried to sneak armoured cars into the station, but the Poles destroyed the bridge beforehand.  Finally, an armored train attack on Chojnice was repulsed.

The Polish troops managed to hold back the German advance until the early afternoon, but at 14:00 the German troops threatened to surround the city and the Polish units were forced to retreat east towards Rytel. The 18th Pomeranian Uhlan Regiment was ordered to cover the retreat of the infantry, and launched a mounted attack against the Germans at Krojanty.

See also
nearby Charge at Krojanty
List of World War II military equipment of Poland
List of German military equipment of World War II

References

Further reading
 K. Ciechanowski, Walka pod Chojnicami 1 IX 1939 r. [in:] Zapiski historyczne, Toruń Nr 2, 1962

Chojnice
Chojnice
Pomeranian Voivodeship (1919–1939)
September 1939 events
History of Pomeranian Voivodeship